The Naval Strike Wing (NSW) was a flying  unit of the Fleet Air Arm of the Royal Navy.  It was formed on 9 March 2007 (following the re-forming of 800 Naval Air Squadron in 2006, and 801 Naval Air Squadron on 9 March 2007).  It included elements of 801 and 800 Squadrons, amalgamated into a single operational unit for deployment either on land or aboard the Royal Navy's aircraft carriers.  Equipped with Harrier GR7 and GR9 aircraft and based at RAF Cottesmore, NSW was the Naval component of Joint Force Harrier.

On 1 April 2010, NSW reverted to the identity of 800 NAS, flying the Harrier GR9 and GR9A variants. Following the decision to withdraw the Harrier from service in the 2010 Strategic Defence and Security Review, a Harrier GR9 made its last flight from a Royal Navy aircraft carrier, on 24 November 2010.

References

Military units and formations established in 2007
British wings